Marija Petrović (born 18 March 1994) is a Serbian handball player who plays for Gloria Buzău.

International honours 
EHF Champions League: 
Finalist: 2017, 2018

References

External links

 

1994 births
Living people
Serbian female handball players
Sportspeople from Niš
Universiade medalists in handball
Expatriate handball players
Serbian expatriate sportspeople in North Macedonia
Serbian expatriate sportspeople in Romania
Universiade bronze medalists for Serbia
Medalists at the 2015 Summer Universiade